Raymond Bellour (born 1939 in Lyon) is a French scholar, and writer. Best known to Anglophone readers for his publications on film analysis, his work is dispersed across a wide range of articles and books, few of which are available in English, in which he addresses a broad spectrum of topics in the areas of cinema, literature and moving-image art. He is currently Director of Research, Emeritus, at the CNRS, the Centre national de la recherche scientifique, which he entered in 1964. In the course of his career he has taught at the Université de Paris I, at IDHEC (now "la Fémis"), the Université de Paris III, the Centre américain d'études cinématographiques, later renamed the Centre parisien d'études critiques, and in a range of international institutions as a guest lecturer. In 1990 with Christine Van Assche and Catherine David he co-curated the Passages de l'image exhibition at the Centre Georges Pompidou. He helped found the journal Trafic in 1991, with Serge Daney, and Jean-Claude Biette,

Works
 Le Livre des autres: entretiens avec M. Foucault, C. Lévi-Strauss, R. Barthes, P. Francastel ..., L’Herne, 1971
 'Segmenting/Analysing', Quarterly Review of Film Studies, Vol. 1, No. 3, August 1976, pp. 331–353
 L'Analyse du film, 1979. Translated as The Analysis of Film
 'Psychosis, Neurosis, Perversion', Camera Obscura, nos 3–4, 1979, pp. 104–34. Reprinted in Marshall Deutelbaum, Leland A. Poague, eds., A Hitchcock Reader, 2nd ed., Wiley-Blackwell, 2009, pp. 341 ff.
 Henri Michaux, 1986
 Mademoiselle Guillotine, 1989
 Eye for I: Video Self-Portraits, New York: Independent Curators Inc., 1989
 L'Entre-Images: Photo, Cinéma, Vidéo, 1990
 Jean-Luc Godard: Son + Image 1974-1991, 1992
 Oubli, 1992
 L'Entre-Images 2, 1999
 Partages de l'ombre, 2002
 Le Corps du cinéma, 2009
 La Querelle des dispositifs: Cinéma - installations, expositions, 2012 
 L'Enfant, 2013
 Pensées du cinéma, 2016

References

External links
 Catherine Grant, Film Theory Unstilled: Raymond Bellour, Film Studies for Free, 10 October 2009

1939 births
Living people
French film critics
French male non-fiction writers
Writers from Lyon
Academic staff of Sorbonne Nouvelle University Paris 3
Research directors of the French National Centre for Scientific Research